Erdoitza Goikoetxea Zornoza (born 24 January 1975, in Bilbao) is a Spanish former field hockey player who competed in the 2000 Summer Olympics and in the 2004 Summer Olympics.

References

External links
 

1975 births
Living people
Spanish female field hockey players
Olympic field hockey players of Spain
Field hockey players at the 2000 Summer Olympics
Field hockey players at the 2004 Summer Olympics
Sportspeople from Bilbao
Field hockey players from the Basque Country (autonomous community)